Ługowo may refer to the following places:
Ługowo, Strzelce-Drezdenko County in Lubusz Voivodeship (west Poland)
Ługowo, Zielona Góra County in Lubusz Voivodeship (west Poland)
Ługowo, West Pomeranian Voivodeship (north-west Poland)